The 1966 American Football League season was the seventh regular season of the AFL.

The season also saw the debut of the expansion Miami Dolphins, the AFL's ninth team (an odd number), requiring an idle team each week. A sixth official, the Line Judge, was added to the officiating crew; the NFL added the Line Judge the previous season.

The season ended when the Kansas City Chiefs defeated the two-time defending champion Buffalo Bills in the AFL Championship game, and were defeated by the NFL's Green Bay Packers in the first AFL-NFL World Championship Game, now known as Super Bowl I.

Division races
The AFL now had nine teams, grouped into two divisions (the new Miami team was in the Eastern Division, now with five teams), and still played a 14-game schedule.  In previous seasons (with eight clubs), each played a home-and-away game against the other seven.  All nine teams faced each other at least once, and each team played six others twice.  Though Boston and Miami were both in the Eastern Division, they met only once, on November 27 (each team played Western Division teams Kansas City and Denver twice, while Boston also played San Diego twice and Miami played Oakland twice --- meaning that the Patriots and Dolphins each had a schedule that called for them to face three non-division opponents more often than they played a divisional opponent).

As in earlier years, the division champions met in the league championship game, with the home team rotating, this year to the Eastern champion.  If there was a tie in the standings at the top of either division, a one-game playoff would be held to determine the division winner, with the other division's winner idle.

Regular season
Prior to the season, the AFL–NFL merger was announced in June, and both leagues agreed to have their champions meet in an annual AFL-NFL World Championship Game (later known as the Super Bowl), beginning in January 1967. Additionally, a common draft was introduced, with the first held in March 1967.

Also, the Miami Dolphins joined the AFL as its first expansion team. Joe Auer would score the first touchdown in Dolphins history, returning an opening kickoff for 95 yards versus the Oakland Raiders.

Results

Standings

Playoffs 

 AFL Championship Game
Kansas City Chiefs 31, Buffalo Bills 7, January 1, 1967, War Memorial Stadium, Buffalo, New York
 Super Bowl I 
Green Bay Packers (NFL) 35, Kansas City Chiefs (AFL) 10, at Los Angeles Memorial Coliseum, Los Angeles, California

Stadium changes
 The Oakland Raiders moved from Frank Youell Field to the new Oakland–Alameda County Coliseum
 The expansion Miami Dolphins began play at the Orange Bowl

Coaching changes

Offseason
Buffalo Bills: Lou Saban resigned and defensive coach Joe Collier was promoted.
Houston Oilers: Hugh Taylor was fired and Wally Lemm took over as head coach in late January.
Miami Dolphins: The expansion team's first head coach was George Wilson.
Oakland Raiders: Al Davis stepped down as head coach in April to serve as AFL commissioner, and backfield coach John Rauch was promoted.

In-season
Denver Broncos: Mac Speedie resigned after starting the season 0–2; line coach Ray Malavasi was interim head coach for the rest of the season.

References

External links 
 Football Database

 
American Football League seasons